McKendree Methodist Episcopal Church is a historic church building at 503 Betsy Pack Drive in Jasper, Tennessee, that was formerly the home of the McKendree United Methodist Church and is now home to Faith Baptist Church.

It was built in 1875 and added to the National Register of Historic Places in 1978.

McKendree United Methodist Church is now located at 106 Highway 150 in Jasper.

References

External links
 
 McKendree United Methodist Church

United Methodist churches in Tennessee
Churches on the National Register of Historic Places in Tennessee
Churches completed in 1875
19th-century Methodist church buildings in the United States
Buildings and structures in Marion County, Tennessee
National Register of Historic Places in Marion County, Tennessee